Sakari Pietilä (born 21 June 1954) is a Finnish former professional ice hockey player.

Pietilä was a SM-liiga head coach with HPK for the 1995–96 SM-liiga season and Jokerit for the 1997–98 SM-liiga season. He was the head coach of the Estonia men's national ice hockey team from 2013 until he was replace by Ismo Lehkonen on January 23, 2015.

References

External links

1954 births
Living people
Finnish ice hockey coaches
Finnish ice hockey centres
Chicago Blackhawks scouts
Sportspeople from Oulu